Surahammar ( or ) is a locality and the seat of Surahammar Municipality in Västmanland County, Sweden with 6,179 inhabitants in 2010.

References 

Municipal seats of Västmanland County
Swedish municipal seats
Populated places in Västmanland County
Populated places in Surahammar Municipality